Posidippus of Pella ( Poseidippos; c. 310 – c. 240 BC)  was an Ancient Greek epigrammatic poet.

Life
Posidippus was born in the city of Pella, capital of the kingdom of Macedon as the son of Admetos. He lived for some time in Samos before moving permanently to the court of Ptolemy I Soter and later Ptolemy II Philadelphus in Alexandria, Egypt. An inscription from Thermon in Aetolia records that he was honoured by the Aetolian League in about 264/3 BC. He was friends with the poets Asclepiades of Samos and Hedylus.

Poetry
Twenty-three of Posidippus' poems were included in the Greek Anthology, and several more were quoted in either part or whole by Athenaeus of Naucratis in his Deipnosophistae. Until 2001, based on these remains, it was assumed that Posidippus wrote only about drinking and love. In that year the Milan Papyrus P.Mil.Vogl. VIII 309 was recovered from the wrappings of an Egyptian mummy dating to about 180 BC. It contained 112 poems, two of which were previously known to have been written by Posidippus, which address subjects that include events of the court of the Ptolemaic dynasty, gemstones, and bird divination. Because of Posidippus' authorship of these two poems, scholars have concluded that the other poems of the Milan Papyrus were also written by him.

The poems of the Milan Papyrus are grouped into sections, and the papyrus largely preserves the section headers for the surviving poems:

 On Stones (Lithika [title restored from two partially preserved letters], poems 1-20)
 On Omens (Oionoskopika, 21-35)
 Dedications (Anathematika, 36-41)
 Epitaphs (Epitumbia [conjecture: title not preserved], 42-61)
 On Statues (Andriantopoiika, 62-70)
 On Equestrian Victories (Hippika, 71-88)
 On Shipwrecks (Nauagika, 89-94)
 On Cures (Iamatika, 95-101)
 Characters (Tropoi, 102-109)
 [title lost] (110-112)

Editions
 Posidippus' Milan Papyrus poetry book: Greek text and English translation  (PDF) by various hands (CHS)
 Bastianini G. - Gallazzi C. (edd.), Papiri dell’Università di Milano - Posidippo di Pella. Epigrammi, LED Edizioni Universitarie, Milano, 2001, 
 Austin C. - Bastianini G. (edd.), Posidippi Pellaei quae supersunt omnia , LED Edizioni Universitarie, Milano, 2002,

Notes

Further reading
 Acosta-Hughes, Benjamin, Elizabeth Kosmetatou, and Manuel Baumbach, eds. 2004. Labored in Papyrus Leaves: Perspectives on an Epigram Collection Attributed to Posidippus (P.Mil.Vogl. VIII 309). Cambridge, MA: Harvard Univ. Press.
 Battezzato, L. 2003. "Song, Performance, and Text in the New Posidippus." Zeitschrift für Papyrologie und Epigraphik 145: 31-43.
 Dickie, Matthew W. 2005. "The Sschatology of the Epitaphs in the New Posidippus Papyrus." In Papers of the Langford Latin Seminar. Edited by Francis Cairns, Vol. 12, 19–52. Cambridge, UK: Francis Cairns.
 Di Nino, Margherita Maria. 2009. "Lost at Sea: Pythermus as an Anti-Odysseus? American Journal of Philology 130.1:47-65.
 Fantuzzi, Marco. 2004. "Erotic Epigrams." In Tradition and Innovation in Hellenistic Poetry. By Marco Fantuzzi and Richard Hunter, 338–349. Cambridge, UK: Cambridge Univ. Press.
 Gutzwiller, Kathryn J. 2002. "Posidippus on Statuary." In Il papiro di Posidippo un anno dopo. Edited by Guido Bastianini and Angelo Casanova, 41–60. Florence: Istituto Papirologico “G. Vitelli.”
 Gutzwiller, Kathryn. ed. 2005. The New Posidippus: A Hellenistic Poetry Book. Oxford: Oxford Univ. Press.
 Hutchinson, Gregory O. 2002. "The New Posidippus and Latin Poetry." Zeitschrift für Papyrologie und Epigraphik 138:1–10.
 Lloyd-Jones, Hugh. 1963. "The Seal of Poseidippus." Journal of Hellenic Studies 83:75–99.
 Stephens, Susan A. 2004. "Posidippus' Poetry Book: Where Macedon meets Egypt." In Ancient Alexandria between Egypt and Greece. Edited by William V. Harris and Giovanni Ruffini, 63–86. Leiden: Brill.

External links

 CHS Classics@ Issue 1: Posidippus
 Posidippus bibliography (Martine Cuypers)
 Posidippus bibliography (Kathryn Gutzwiller)
 The New Posidippus: A Hellenistic Poetry Book by Kathryn J. Gutzwiller
 Homeric Echoes in Possipidus by Gregory Nagy at the Center for Hellenic Studies

Ancient Greek poets
Ancient Pellaeans
Ancient Macedonian poets
Epigrammatists of the Greek Anthology
3rd-century BC Macedonians
3rd-century BC poets
Ancient Macedonians in Greece proper
Ptolemaic court
310s BC births
240s BC deaths